Jean-Louis Annecy born circa 1758 and died circa 1807 was a French politician who was a victim of the deportation of guadeloupeans and haïtians in Corsica by Napoleon Bonaparte.

He was elected to the Council of Ancients on 17 April 1797.

See also
Jean-Baptiste Mills

References

Sources and bibliography
 Observations d'Etienne Mentor et Jean Louis Anncy députés de Saint-Domingue. Sur l'opinion du Citoyen Brothier, Membre du Conseil des Anciens
 Liste des représentants du peuple, membres des deux conseils au 1er prairial Imprimerie nationale, 1798
 Conseil des Cinq-Cents / séance du 26 pluviôse. Compte-rendu
 Bernard Gainot « La députation de Saint-Domingue au corps législatif du Directoire » Outre-Mers. Revue d'histoire, 1997,  316  pp. 95-110] on Persée (web portal in history)
 Bernard Gainot Bernard Gainot Figures d'esclaves. Présence, paroles, représentation Chapter 4. Jean-Louis Annecy (vers 1758-vers 1807) : du Cap-Français aux Tuileries, des Tuileries au bagne, un parcours emblématique pp. 71-84

External links 
Data Bibliothèque Nationale de France

1758 births
1807 deaths
People of Saint-Domingue
Haitian politicians